Sulaimon Shekoni Solomon professionally known as Khaid, is a Nigerian singer, rapper, and songwriter signed to Neville Records. He rose to stardom with the release of the song "With You", after signing a record deal with Sydney Talker's Neville Records in 2022, which earned him his first chart entry on Nigeria TurnTable Top 50 single chart at number forty-eight on 14 February 2022.

Early life
Sulaimon Shekoni Abiola grew up in Shibiri-Ojo, and is from a family of ten. He tells Pulse Nigeria author Onyema Courage, in an interview “My Dad advised me to learn a skill since making music wasn't paying the bills”. Thereafter, Sulaimon worked as a roadside mechanic in the street of Ojo fixing vehicles, to earn a living to support his family, and be able to fund his music career.

Career
He started his music career in the street of Ojo. In 2021, Khaid posted a viral freestyle on Instagram that caught the attention of Sydney Talker who offered him a recording deal and introduced him to the public on 20 January 2022 as  Sydney's Neville Records' first artist. He went on to release his first single "With You" on 28 January 2022, which peaked at number 48 on Nigeria TurnTable chart.  Its accompanying music video was directed by Olu the Wave and currently has 4.1 million views on YouTube, as of February 2023. 

On 22 April 2022, he released "SKI", with its music video directed by Sydney Talker. According to The Native author Wonu Osikoya, “"Ski" Paints An Honest Picture Of His Life Before Fame”. On 27 May 2022, Khaid released his six-track debut extended play Diversity (stylized as DIVERSITY). Reviewing for The Native, Wonu Osikoya called the EP “A collage of vibrant sounds that will appeal to the young and the young-at-heart”. On 4 June 2022, Khaid lead Pulse Nigeria Future Sounds Vol.10 playlist with his single "With You", 

On 22 June 2022, he was named Apple Music’s Up Next Artist for Nigeria. On 2 August 2022, he reveals how a DM from Sydney Talker changed his life, during an interview on the Midday Show with Do2tun, and Eve on Cool FM 96.9 Lagos. On 9 November 2022, he released "Amala", which became his much-anticipated single after his freestyle became viral on Instagram, and TikTok. "Amala" features guest vocals from Zlatan, and Rexxie, who also serves as the producer. Its accompanying visualizer, directed by Sydney Talker. 

On 14 November 2022, "Amala" debuted at number 91 on the official Nigeria TurnTable Top 100 songs, number 66 on Top Streaming Songs, and number 24 on Top Street-POP Songs. On 20 January 2023, "Jolie" debuted at number 92 on the official Nigeria TurnTable Top 100 songs, and was released for digital streaming on 25 January 2023, and was named one of the Best Afrobeats Songs out right now by OkayAfrica. On 30 January 2023, he ranked at number 1 on TurnTable's NXT Emerging Top Artistes.

On 31 January 2023, Spotify cited him as one of the emerging artistes to look out for from Nigeria, alongside Tempoe, and Poco Lee.
On 13 February 2023, "Jolie" peaked at number 7 on the official Nigeria TurnTable Top 100 songs. On 14 February 2023, Sydney Talker shares a screenshot of his Instagram DM, where Davido leaves a remark on "Jolie", which reads “I have played this song like 100 times in my house”. On 18 February 2023, "Jolie" ranked at number 5 on TheCable's list of 10 TCL radio pick of the week.

Discography

EPs

Singles

As lead artist

References 

Living people
Musicians from Lagos
Nigerian male rappers
Nigerian male singers
21st-century Nigerian musicians
Nigerian singer-songwriters